Darglitazone (previously known as CP 86325-2) is a member of the  class of drugs and an agonist of peroxisome proliferator-activated receptor-γ (PPAR-γ), an orphan member of the nuclear receptor superfamily of transcription factors.

Its development was terminated on November 08, 1999.

Synthesis

References 

Abandoned drugs
Oxazoles
Thiazolidinediones